The 1997–98 season was a disaster turned into a success for Huddersfield Town. After a closed season of little activity in the transfer market, Town started the 1997–98 season disastrously and, after some questionable signings and tactical decisions, Brian Horton was sacked in October 1997 as the club lay at the foot of Division One. Thirty-six-year-old former Huddersfield, Bradford City and Newcastle United central defender Peter Jackson was drafted in as Horton's replacement in October and turned the club's fortunes around drastically. He immediately installed the experienced former Wales manager Terry Yorath as his assistant. Given a generous transfer budget by the board, Jackson captured experienced pros such as former Welsh internationals Barry Horne and David Phillips in addition to powerful local-born striker Wayne Allison from Division 1 rivals Swindon Town. He also managed to rejuvenate players such as Marcus Stewart and, particularly, the previously inconsistent Paul Dalton to the extent that the club finished a respectable 16th in the final table.

Squad at the start of the season

Review
The start of the season was the worst in the entire history of Huddersfield Town. Town won none of their first 14 league games. In fact the only games they won were two League Cup ties against Bradford City and more surprisingly Premier League side West Ham United (they eventually lost 3–1 on aggregate against the Hammers) Manager Brian Horton dropped popular keeper Steve Francis for the televised game against Nottingham Forest. Town lost the game 2–0 and two days later Horton was shown the door.

Popular ex-player Peter Jackson was hired three days later, but Town lost four of Jackson's first 5 games and drew the other, conceding 14 goals and only scoring three. Then amazingly, Town beat Stoke City 3–1 on 1 November and the fightback began. Jackson brought in experienced players such as Barry Horne, Wayne Allison, David Phillips and Lee Richardson, as well as loan signing Steve Harper from Newcastle United. They then managed to beat Manchester City 1–0 in a televised game at Maine Road in November.

After another severe dip in form during February and March, in which Town lost five out of six, some thought that survival was a bridge too far for Jackson's side. But a six-match unbeaten run near the end of the season, followed by a win against West Bromwich Albion, confirmed Town's safety. They finished in 16th position and used a record 37 players during that season, including four goalkeepers. The season will always be remembered and referred to as "The Great Escape".

Squad at the end of the season

Results

Division One

FA Cup

League Cup

Appearances and goals

References

1997-98
Hudd